Gianmarco Di Francesco (born 2 August 1989) is an Italian former professional cyclist.

Major results

2011
 9th Coppa della Pace
 9th Trofeo Internazionale Bastianelli
2014
 1st Stage 3 Giro della Regione Friuli
2015
 1st Gran Premio Industrie del Marmo
 4th Trofeo Internazionale Bastianelli
2016
 5th Gran Premio Industrie del Marmo
 6th Memorial Marco Pantani
 8th Coppa Bernocchi
 8th Tour of Almaty

References

External links
 
 
 

Italian male cyclists
1989 births
Living people
Cyclists from Abruzzo
People from Teramo
Sportspeople from the Province of Teramo